Devanangurichi is a census town in Namakkal district  in the state of Tamil Nadu, India.

Demographics
 India census, Devanangurichi had a population of 6817. Males constitute 51% of the population and females 49%. Devanangurichi has an average literacy rate of 61%, higher than the national average of 59.5%: male literacy is 71% and, female literacy is 51%. In Devanangurichi, 11% of the population is under 6 years of age.

References

Cities and towns in Namakkal district